Požarevac Airport ( / Aerodrom Požarevac) was one of the oldest airports in Serbia, opened in 1915 and closed in 1976. Požarevac Airport was replaced with new Kostolac Airport near Požarevac.

See also
Kostolac Airport
List of airports in Serbia

External links
Serbian Airforce Blériot XI-2 aircraft named "Oluj" (Storm) at Požarevac Airport, May 1915, equipped with Schwarzlose MG M.07/12, 8x57mm IS/IRS Mauser caliber heavy belt fed water–cooled aircraft machine gun

Defunct airports
Airports in Serbia
Požarevac